The Spencer repeating rifles and carbines were 19th-century American lever-action firearms invented by Christopher Spencer. The Spencer was the world's first military metallic-cartridge repeating rifle, and over 200,000 examples were manufactured in the United States by the Spencer Repeating Rifle Co. and Burnside Rifle Co. between 1860 and 1869. The Spencer repeating rifle was adopted by the Union Army, especially by the cavalry, during the American Civil War but did not replace the standard issue muzzle-loading rifled muskets in use at the time. Among the early users was George Armstrong Custer. The Spencer carbine was a shorter and lighter version designed for the cavalry.

Design

The Spencer is a lever-action repeating rifle designed by Christopher Spencer in 1860.  It uses a falling breechblock mounted in a carrier. Firing forces are contained by the receiver at the rear of the breechblock.  Actuating the loading lever causes the breechblock to fall.  Once the breechblock is clear of the receiver, the carrier "rolls" downward, ejecting a spent cartridge from the chamber and collecting a fresh round from the tubular magazine in the buttstock.  Closing the lever chambers the new cartridge and the breechblock then rises vertically to close the breech. The hammer of the Spencer needs to be manually cocked after each loading cycle.  The Spencer was initially produced as a carbine, chambered for the .56-56 Spencer rimfire cartridge.

The magazine of the Spencer holds seven rounds. It is filled by withdrawing the spring assembly from the butt plate. Rounds can be loaded individually; however, Erastus Blakeslee invented a cartridge box containing cylinders with seven cartridges each. These cylinders can be quickly emptied into the magazine tube.

Later calibers used a smaller diameter, lighter bullet and larger powder charge to increase power and range over the original .56-56 cartridge, which was almost as powerful as the .58 caliber rifled musket of the time but under-powered by the standards of other early cartridges such as the .50–70 and .45-70.

Use in the military

American Civil War

When Spencer signed his new rifle up for adoption right after the Civil War broke out, the view by the Department of War Ordnance Department was that soldiers would waste ammunition by firing too rapidly with repeating rifles, and thus denied a government contract for all such weapons. (They did, however, encourage the use of breech-loading carbine, which is also single-shot like most firearms of the day, but is shorter than standard rifles and thus more suited to mounted warfare) More accurately, they feared that the Army's logistics train would be unable to provide enough ammunition for the soldiers in the field, as they already had grave difficulty bringing up enough ammunition to sustain armies of tens of thousands of men over distances of hundreds of miles. A weapon able to fire several times as fast would require a vastly expanded logistics train and place great strain on the already overburdened railroads and tens of thousands of more mules, wagons, and wagon train guard detachments. Its unit cost (several times that of a Springfield Model 1861 rifled musket) also stood in the way. However, shortly after the July 1863 Battle of Gettysburg, Spencer was able to gain an audience with President Abraham Lincoln, who invited him to a shooting match and demonstration of the weapon on the lawn of the White House. Lincoln was deeply impressed with the weapon, and ordered Gen. James Wolfe Ripley to adopt it for production. Ripley disobeyed the order and continued to use the old single-shooters, causing him to be replaced as head of the Ordnance Department later that year.

The Spencer repeating rifle was first adopted by the United States Navy, and later by the United States Army, and was used during the American Civil War, where it was a popular weapon.  The Confederates occasionally captured some of these weapons and ammunition, but, as they were unable to manufacture the cartridges because of their dire copper shortage, their utilization of the weapons was limited.

Notable early instances of use included the Battle of Hoover's Gap (where Colonel John T. Wilder's "Lightning Brigade" of mounted infantry effectively demonstrated the firepower of repeaters), and the Gettysburg Campaign, where two regiments of the Michigan Brigade (under Brigadier General George Armstrong Custer) carried them at the Battle of Hanover and at East Cavalry Field. 

As the war progressed, Spencers were carried by a number of Union cavalry and mounted infantry regiments and provided the Union army with a firepower advantage over their Confederate opponents. At the Battle of Nashville, 9,000 mounted infantrymen armed with the Spencer, under the command of Maj. Gen. James H. Wilson, chief of cavalry for the Military Division of the Mississippi, rode around Gen. Hood's left flank and attacked from the rear.  President Lincoln's assassin John Wilkes Booth was armed with a Spencer carbine at the time he was captured and killed.

The Spencer showed itself to be very reliable under combat conditions, with a sustainable rate-of-fire in excess of 20 rounds per minute. Compared to standard muzzle-loaders, with a rate of fire of 2–3 rounds per minute, this represented a significant tactical advantage. However, effective tactics had yet to be developed to take advantage of the higher rate of fire. Similarly, the supply chain was not well prepared enough to transport the extra ammunition. Detractors also complained that the amount of smoke produced was such that it was hard to see the enemy, which was not surprising since even the smoke produced by muzzleloaders would quickly blind whole regiments, and even divisions as if they were standing in thick fog, especially on still days.

One of the advantages of the Spencer was that its ammunition was waterproof and hardy, and could stand the constant jostling of long storage on the march, such as Wilson's Raid. The story goes that every round of paper and linen Sharps ammunition carried in the supply wagons was found useless after long storage in supply wagons.  Spencer ammunition had no such problem owing to the new technology of metallic cartridges.

In the late 1860s, the Spencer company was sold to the Fogerty Rifle Company and ultimately to Winchester.  Many Spencer carbines were later sold as surplus to France where they were used during the Franco-Prussian War in 1870.

Even though the Spencer company went out of business in 1869, ammunition was manufactured in the United States into the 1920s.  Later, many rifles and carbines were converted to centerfire, which could fire cartridges made from the centerfire .50-70 brass. The original archetype of rimfire ammunition can still be obtained on the specialty market.

Use against Native Americans
In 1867 Brigadier General James F. Rusling of the Quartermaster's Department recommended cavalry exclusively use the carbine against mounted Indian raiders, after completing a one-year tour of the new western territories.

In the summer of 1870–1871 Chilean cavalry adopted the rifles, a change that substantially increased military disparity with the indigenous Mapuche who were at war with Chile. An example of this was Quilapán's warriors' attack on Chilean cavalry on January 25, 1871, when mounted Mapuche warriors were armed with spears and bolas. The Mapuches panicked as they did not expect a second round of shots, and casualties among them were high.

In September 1868 Major Frederick A. Forsyth led a small force of veterans, an "elite mounted attack-and-pursuit force", and came into heavy contact with a superior number of
Cheyenne warriors led by Roman Nose.  The battle is known as the Battle of Beecher Island.  Forsyth's band was armed with Spencer repeating carbines and 150 rounds of .56-50 Spencer cartridges. Forsyth and his men were able to hold off and turn away a vastly larger force.  It is claimed that this was largely due to the "rapid firepower of the seven-shot Spencer carbines."

See also
 M1819 Hall rifle
 Cimarron Firearms
 Colt's New Model Revolving rifle
 Henry rifle
 Rifles in the American Civil War
 Sharps rifle
 Volcanic rifle

Footnotes

References

Further reading

 Barnes, Cartridges of the World.
 Earl J. Coates and Dean S. Thomas, An Introduction to Civil War Small Arms.
 Ian V. Hogg, Weapons of the Civil War.
 Chris Kyle and William Doyle, "American Gun: A History of the U.S. in Ten Firearms".
 Philip Leigh Lee's Lost Dispatch and Other Civil War Controversies, (Yardley, Penna.:, Westholme Publishing, 2015), 214
 Marcot, Roy A. Spencer Repeating Firearms 1995.
 Sherman, William T. Memoirs Volume 2 - contains an account of the success of the Spencer on combat (pp. 187–8) and reflections on the role of the repeating rifle in warfare (pp. 394–5).

External links
 The patent drawing for the Spencer action
 Description and photos of Spencer rifle, serial number 3981
 Production information on the Spencer carbine
 The Spencer repeater and other breechloaders used in the Civil War

American Civil War rifles
Early rifles
Guns of the American West
Lever-action rifles
Rifles of the United States
Hunting rifles